The Portuguese Women's Volleyball Cup is the national cup competition for women’s volleyball clubs in Portugal. It is organized and administrated by the Portuguese Volleyball Federation (FPV). It is contested since 1972–73 by clubs of all Portuguese divisions.

Leixões SC is the most successful club having won the competition ten times.

Results

Titles by club

References
 Portuguese Volleyball Federation (all champions and results from 1997–98 onwards)
 Mundo desportivo (runners-up and results from 1972–73 to 1996–97, sets result of 2002–03, runner-up and result of 2003–04)

2018/19: https://www.zerozero.pt/edition.php?id=129023

Cup, Portuguese Women's Volleyball